Horst Steffen (born 3 March 1969) is a German football coach and a former player. He manages SV Elversberg.

Managerial statistics

Honours
Borussia Mönchengladbach
 DFB-Pokal runner-up: 1991–92

MSV Duisburg
 DFB-Pokal runner-up: 1997–98

References

External links
 
 

1969 births
Living people
German footballers
Footballers from North Rhine-Westphalia
Association football midfielders
Germany under-21 international footballers
German football managers
Bundesliga players
KFC Uerdingen 05 players
Borussia Mönchengladbach players
MSV Duisburg players
3. Liga managers
Stuttgarter Kickers managers
SC Preußen Münster managers
Chemnitzer FC  managers